Blondie (also known as The New Blondie) is an American sitcom that aired on CBS during the 1968–69 television season. The series is an updated version of the 1957 TV series that was based on the comic strip of the same name. The series stars Patricia Harty as the title character and Will Hutchins as her husband Dagwood Bumstead. Jim Backus played Dagwood's boss Mr. Dithers, with his real-life wife Henny Backus playing Cora Dithers. The series also featured the noted child character actress Pamelyn Ferdin as the Bumsteads' daughter, Cookie, and character actor Bryan O'Byrne as the hapless mailman, always getting run over by Dagwood hurrying out the door, late for work.

Synopsis
Blondie stars Patricia Harty and Will Hutchins as Blondie and Dagwood Bumstead, a suburban couple raising two precocious children. Plots mixed typical sitcom tropes from home life and work life. The series is best remembered for its opening theme, which featured the comic strip characters in animated form before transforming into the actors playing the characters.

Like the 1957 version, which lasted only one season, the series was not a hit, lasting a total of 13 weeks before being canceled, with the final episode remaining unaired. Two further episodes were planned, "The Dying Swan" and "Dagwood's Private War", but were never completed.

Cast

 Patricia Harty as Blondie 
 Will Hutchins as Dagwood Bumstead
 Jim Backus as Mr. Dithers
 Pamelyn Ferdin as Cookie 
 Peter Robbins as Alexander
 Henny Backus as Mrs. Cora Dithers 
 Bobbi Jordan as Tootsie Woodley 
 Bryan O'Byrne as the mailman Mr. Beasley

Ferdin and Robbins would later reunite on the 1969 television special It Was a Short Summer, Charlie Brown and the 1969 film A Boy Named Charlie Brown, being the last time Robbins played Charlie Brown.

Production notes
This version of the series, jointly produced by CBS Productions (which owns the distribution rights in the United States), King Features Syndicate and Kayro Productions, ran from September 26, 1968, to January 9, 1969.

Cast member Pamelyn Ferdin recalls the series was cancelled so abruptly that the cast was dismissed during the lunch break while an episode was being filmed.

Episode list

References

Further reading
 Blondie Goes to Hollywood, by Carol Lynn Scherling. Albany, 2010. BearManor Media. .

External links 
 Official Blondie Website
 
 Blonde_1968 at ctva.biz

1968 American television series debuts
1969 American television series endings
1960s American sitcoms
CBS original programming
English-language television shows
Television shows based on comic strips
Television series reboots
Blondie (comic strip)
Television series by Universal Television
Television series by CBS Studios